Sinteza, is the name of a large chemical factory in Rogerius quarter, Oradea, Transylvania, Romania. During Communist times, it was a large employer in the area, even though now its operations have been considerably reduced. It does remain, however, one of Oradea's best known industrial areas.

Chemical companies of Romania
Buildings and structures in Oradea
Privatized companies in Romania
Companies listed on the Bucharest Stock Exchange
Companies of Bihor County